Meşveret (Ottoman Turkish: Consultation) was a bimonthly magazine which existed between 1895 and 1898. Published in Paris the magazine was the first official organ of the Committee of Union and Progress and was subtitled as “the media organ of the Ottoman Committee of Union and Progress".

History and profile
The first issue of Meşveret appeared on 1 December 1895. Ahmet Rıza, exiled leader of the Committee of Union and Progress, was the cofounder and editor of the magazine which was published in Paris to support the policies of the Committee. The other founders included Albert Fua, Aristidi Efendi and Halil Ganem. The latter was also a regular contributor. The other major contributors included Mizancı Murat Bey, Şerafeddin Mağmumi and Abdullah Cevdet who used the pseudonym “Bir Kürd” (A Kurd in English). From 7 December the magazine published a French supplement entitled Mechvéret supplément français.

Meşveret was published on a bimonthly basis. The magazine supported the adoption of a constitution in the Ottoman Empire and the abduction of Sultan Abdul Hamid who demanded the French authorities to take steps to reduce criticisms published in the magazine and also, to ban the periodicals and newspapers published by the Ottoman exiles in Paris. Upon Sultan's request Ahmet Rıza was detained by the French authorities. Meşveret ceased publication in 1898 after producing a total of thirty issues. The final issue was dated 7 May.

References

1895 establishments in France
1898 disestablishments in France
Bi-monthly magazines published in France
Censorship in France
Committee of Union and Progress
Defunct political magazines published in France
Magazines published in Paris
Propaganda newspapers and magazines
Magazines established in 1895
Magazines disestablished in 1898
Turkish-language magazines